Annie May Constance Summerbelle (1867 – 1947) was an Australian composer of light classical and popular music. She was the third daughter of Captain William and Honoriah Summerbelle of Double Bay. Her sister, Stella Clare, married Francis Joseph Bayldon, a master mariner and nautical instructor. From the late 1880s she was a student of Alice Charbonnet-Kellermann, with Summerbelle's earliest compositions appearing in the early 1890s.

Among a hundred compositions, she had music selected for the British Empire Exhibition in London. 
Her song So Long was played by the Australian Light Horse as the first wave embarked on the Gallipoli campaign.

She married Herbert Glasson in 1893 and wrote 'Love is a fadeless flower' while heavily pregnant with his child. The same year Herbert was convicted and executed for murder and robbery under arms.
Ms Summerbelle involved herself with repertory theatre groups via the Sydney Press-Women.

Works

 Thou art mine  1906   
 Valkyrie, op. 6   1910-
 Myee waltz /1890 
 Beaux yeux : waltz  1908 
 Pop-corn : cake walk & two step 1899 
 Gavotte in D : swords and roses dance : op. 4  1916 
 So-long : march-song / words by John Barr ; music by May Summerbelle     1914 
 Wanted for the fighting line : Australian recruiting song / words by Will. M. Fleming ; music by May Summerbelle 1914
 Australia! sighs my heart / words by Ada A. Holman ; music by May Summerbelle
 Ave Maria 
 an article for the Sunday times newspaper

Recordings
Nostalgia - Piano Music by Australian Women by Jeanell Carrigan 2016 Wirrapang Pub.

References

Australian composers
Australian women composers
1867 births
1947 deaths